Jesse May is an American poker commentator and player.

Jesse May was born in New York City in 1971 and raised in Madison, New Jersey, where he first became hooked on poker playing with friends. In 1988, he started attending  The University of Chicago, but he found that classes were clashing with his poker games, and so dropped out. For six years, Jesse travelled the world playing poker.

May found fame presenting the Late Night Poker television series. He also appeared in a season 1 episode under the pseudonym Mickey Dane. This pseudonym is in fact the main character in his poker novel, Shut Up and Deal.

May has continued to be involved in poker commentary on other shows, including the William Hill Poker Grand Prix, PartyPoker.com Football & Poker Legends Cup, The Irish Poker Open, Poker Nations Cup, Poker Million, Victor Chandler Poker Cup, Celebrity Poker Club, and The Poker Show. He also co-presented the PartyGammon Million, a pro backgammon tournament, on early-morning five TV.

He often commentates alongside Padraig Parkinson, who has said that it surprises him that May plays so little poker when he is such a good player.

In 2006, May signed an exclusive contract for presenting televised poker with Matchroom Sport. In January 2012, he was honoured with a Lifetime Achievement Award at the European Poker Awards for his contribution to promoting the game as an author, commentator and personality.

May is married and lives in Denmark.

References

External links
 Industry profile of Jesse May
2002 World Series of Poker write-up by Jesse May
List of TheHendonMob.com articles written by May
Hendon Mob tournament results

21st-century American novelists
American male novelists
American poker players
American gambling writers
University of Chicago alumni
Living people
People from Iowa
Poker commentators
Year of birth missing (living people)
21st-century American male writers
21st-century American non-fiction writers
American male non-fiction writers